Nu gaze (sometimes called newgaze) refers to a form of alternative rock that originated in the 2000s that is directly influenced by the primarily British shoegaze scene of the late 1980s and early 1990s. A renewed interest in shoegaze occurred in the early 2000s when bands such as Maps, My Vitriol, Silversun Pickups, and The Radio Dept. first emerged across both sides of the Atlantic. The origin of the moniker "nu gaze" has been credited to an interview in 2001 with My Vitriol frontman Som Wardner in which he denied his band was shoegaze, instead stating humorously, "I guess you could call us nu gaze".

According to an article in The Oxford Student, music from the genre features "droning riffs, subdued vocals and walls of distorted, messy guitar or synth". The style of the music relies on using various effects such as looping, effects pedals and synthesizers to distort the music. The shoegaze revival draws inspiration heavily from shoegaze but incorporates more modern synthesizers and drum tracks.

The ambient guitar band Hammock, based in Nashville, Tennessee is notable for their ambient rock that combines elements of shoegaze and ambient music. Ulrich Schnauss' 2007 album Goodbye demonstrates the influence of techno and ambient music on the Nu Gaze genre. Ulrich collaborates and performs with numerous artists such as Tangerine Dream and The Engineers.

Examples
 Finelines by My Vitriol has been cited as the first nu gaze album
 "Panic Switch" by Silversun Pickups

References

Shoegaze
British styles of music
British rock music genres
American rock music genres